David Kemp or Dave Kemp may refer to:
 David Kemp (Australian scientist) (1945–2013), plant geneticist and parasitologist
 David Kemp (cyclist) (born 1984), Australian former road bicycle race
 David Kemp (physicist) (born 1945), British physicist, discoverer of otoacoustic emission
 David Kemp (politician) (born 1941), Australian politician
  (born 1945), British sculptor
 Dave Kemp (born 1953), English footballer and manager

See also 

 Davie Kemp